Caldukia is a genus of sea slugs, or more accurately nudibranchs, marine gastropod molluscs, in the family Proctonotidae. One species, Caldukia affinis, is known to occur in Victoria, Australia, while the other two species are endemic to New Zealand.

Species
Species in the genus Caldukia include:
 Caldukia affinis (Burn, 1958)
 Caldukia albolineata Miller, 1970
 Caldukia rubiginosa Miller, 1970

References

 Miller, M.C. & Willan, R.C. (1986) A review of the New Zealand arminacean nudibranchs (Opisthobranchia: Arminacea). New Zealand Journal of Zoology, 13: 377-408.

Proctonotidae